is a town located in Ibi District, Gifu Prefecture, Japan.

Geography
Ōno is located in western Gifu Prefecture, in the northern part of the  Nōbi Plain. The northern part is hilly, with an altitude of approximately 300 meters; however, most of the town is flatland between the Ibi River and the Nagara River. The town has a climate characterized by characterized by hot and humid summers, and mild winters  (Köppen climate classification Cfa).  The average annual temperature in Ōno is 15.1 °C. The average annual rainfall is 2024 mm with September as the wettest month. The temperatures are highest on average in August, at around 27.7 °C, and lowest in January, at around 3.7 °C. The mountainous areas of the town are noted for extremely heavy snow in winter.

Neighbouring municipalities
Gifu Prefecture
Motosu
Mizuho
Ibigawa
Ikeda
Gōdo

Demographics
Per Japanese census data, the population of Ōno has recently plateaued after a long period of growth.

History
The area around Ōno was part of traditional Mino Province.  During the post-Meiji restoration cadastral reforms, the area was organised into Ibi District, Gifu Prefecture. The village of Ōno was formed on July 1, 1889 with the establishment of the modern municipalities system, and was raised to town status on October 1, 1932. Ōno annexed the villages of Nishigun, Toyoki, and Tomoaki in 1954, Uguisu in 1956 and Kawai in 1960.

Education
Ōno has six public elementary schools and two public middle schools operated by the town government. The town does not have a high school. There is one private special education school.

Transportation

Railway
 The town does not have any passenger rail service.

Highway

Sister city relations
 - Shaoyang, Hunan, China

Local attractions
Kiburi-ji, a noted Buddhist temple

Notable people from Ōno
 Akiko Kikuchi, model and actress
 Hirotaka Okada, retired judoka
 Yoshinori Okada, actor

References

External links

Ōno official website 

 
Towns in Gifu Prefecture
Ibi District, Gifu